The Nakhchivan State Museum of History is a museum of history of Nakhchivan, established in 1924. The museum is located on Istiglal Street in the city of Nakhchivan, Nakhchivan Autonomous Republic.

History
Nakhchivan State Museum of History was opened in 1924. The museum was established as a historical-ethnographic museum, originally. In later years, the museum was named as Museum of History and Country Lore. In 1968 the museum obtained the status of State Museum.

References

External links

Museums established in 1924
Museums in Azerbaijan
History museums in Azerbaijan
Buildings and structures in Azerbaijan
1924 establishments in Azerbaijan